is a 2014 Japanese film directed by Yoshihiro Fukagawa and a sequel of Kamisama no Karute. It was released on 21 March 2014.

Plot
Some months after the events in the previous movie, Dr. Kurihara has continued working at Honjo Hospital, a hospital in the Nagano countryside that is on alert 24/7 for all 365 days of the year. He and his wife have now a daughter.
One day, Kurihara learns that his collegemate, Dr. Tatsuya Shindo, is transferring to Honjo. He is happy to meet with his long time friend. Shindo was considered as "the most conscientious of the medical school", but now, his priorities in life have changed, and is dedicated to his wife and child, and will not continue working after hours. This has caused some problems at the beginning of his stay at Honjo. And, especially, with Kurihara.
At the same time, Kurihara has suffered the loss of his mentor, Dr. Nukita, who was director of the Department of Gastroenterology at Honjo, and someone who has spent his whole life at the medical service. Just before his passing, Kurihara and Shindo, who has been influenced also by Nukita, collaborate to make Nukita's dying wish true.

Cast
Sho Sakurai (Dr. Ichito Kurihara)
Aoi Miyazaki (Haruna Kurihara)
Tatsuya Fujiwara (Dr. Tatsuya Shindo)

Reception
As of April 17, 2014, the film has grossed US$7,259,785 in Japan.

References

External links

Films directed by Yoshihiro Fukagawa
2014 films
Films scored by Yuki Hayashi
2010s Japanese films